The North Korea national Under-23 football team represents North Korea at the Asian Games and other under-23 competitions.
They are controlled by the DPR Korea Football Association.

Results and fixtures
Legend

2018

2020

Players

Current squad
The following players were selected to compete in the 2018 Asian Games.

Match date: 27 August 2018
Opposition: 

* Over-aged player.<noinclude>

Previous squads

AFC U-23 Asian Cup
2013 AFC U-22 Championship squads – North Korea
2016 AFC U-23 Championship squads – North Korea
2018 AFC U-23 Championship squads – North Korea

Asian Games
Football at the 2006 Asian Games squads – North Korea
Football at the 2010 Asian Games squads – North Korea
Football at the 2014 Asian Games squads – North Korea

Competitive record

Olympic Games
From 1992 Summer Olympics, at the first tournament to be played in an under-23 format.

AFC U-23 Asian Cup

Asian Games
From 2002 Asian Games, at the first tournament to be played in an under-23 format.

East Asian Games
From 2001 East Asian Games, at the first tournament to be played in an under-23 format.

References

External links
Soccerway - Profile 

u23
Korea Democratic People's Republic